Viaud is a surname. Notable people with the surname include:

Julien Viaud (1850–1923), French novelist and naval officer, wrote under the pseudonym Pierre Loti
Laurent Viaud (born 1969), French writer
Pierre Viaud, French writer

See also
Saint-Viaud, French commune